Chrome Entertainment is a record label and talent agency founded by Hwang Hyun-chang in 2011, based in Seoul, South Korea. Since 2014, Chrome Entertainment is a label under Sony Music Entertainment.

History

Hwang Hyun-chang, a commercial photographer, was inspired to create a girl group after seeing T-ara's "Roly Poly" on television. Before that, he had never paid attention to pop idols and only listened to classical music. After an initial investment of 10 million won, he converted his photography studio, Chrome Creative, into Chrome Entertainment. To finance this venture, Hwang sold his camera gear, used up all his savings, and went into debt. He later said, "If I had known how much it would cost, I would never have done it."

The first group that Chrome Entertainment formed and managed was Crayon Pop, who debuted in July 2012. After the success of Crayon Pop's "Bar Bar Bar", which earned the company US$2 million, Chrome was able to debut more groups. Boy band K-Much debuted in January 2014, and two more groups debuted in June 2014: girl group Bob Girls and male duo Zan Zan (Hangul: 짠짠). On 2 December 2014, male trot singer Her Min-young signed a contract with Chrome Entertainment. On February 24, 2015, it was announced that Bob Girls had disbanded. Later that year, Zan Zan and Her Min-young left the agency.

In 2016, Chrome Entertainment had major changes in management, with founder Hwang Hyun-chang leaving the agency. Kim Jeong-tae replaced him as CEO.

Partnership with Sony Music
On 13 August 2013, Chrome Entertainment signed a strategic partnership contract with Sony Music Entertainment, which gave Sony international distribution rights to Chrome's music and albums. On 7 July 2014, Chrome Entertainment signed a label contract which made Chrome an independent label under Sony Music Entertainment. With this new contract, Chrome has the ability to distribute music from other agencies. In August 2014, it was reported that K-pop trio Lip Service had signed a contract with Chrome Entertainment. The company was subsequently credited under "manufacture" (as Chrome Entertainment Sony Music) on Lip Service's single album, Upgrade, released 20 August 2014.

Concerts
Chrome Entertainment has held several concerts for their artists. The first such concert was on 21 June 2014, called Chrome Happy Concert in Cheongju. On 4 October, the First Chrome Family in Japan Concert was held in Shinagawa, Tokyo. On 3 December, Chrome Family released a single album, 2014 Chrome Family – A Very Special Christmas, with the single "Love Christmas".

Artists

Recording artists
Be.A (Mix9 contestant)
Bz-Boys

Actors
 Cho Hyung-joon
 Lee Geun-hwa
 Lee Ho-suck

Former artists
 Loki (K-Much, 2014)
 Bob Girls (2014–2015)
 Zan Zan (2014–2015)
 Her Min-young (2014–2015)
 Crayon Pop (2012–2017)
 Be.A (2014–2018)

Discography

References

External links
 

Talent agencies of South Korea
Record labels established in 2011
South Korean record labels